Genaro de la Riva Ruiz (9 September 1890 - 25 February 1968) was a Spanish athlete who performed several modalities such as foil, sailing, cricket, field hockey and footballer who played as a midfielder for RCD Espanyol and Catalonia. He was one of the most important figures in the history of RCD Espanyol, both as a player and President of the club, serving as the latter on three separate occasions (1920–22, 1925–30 and 1933–42) for a total of 16 years at the helm of the club. His brothers Victorià and Santiago were also presidents of RCD Espanyol.

Club career
Born in Barcelona to one of the most richest family in Catalonia, Genaro went to study spinning and weaving abroad at the age of just 17, one year in France, one in Belgium (where he was the school's foil champion) and one in England. It was on the latter where he was introduced to football and began developing an interest for the growing sport. Returning to Barcelona in 1910, aged 20, he played in the first team of RCD Espanyol between 1911 and 1912, as a midfielder, helping his team to an unexpected triumph in the 1911–12 Catalan championship, thus interrupting a three-year winning streak of FC Barcelona.

He then joined Polo JC in 1913, where he played cricket and field hockey and where he was the champion of Spain.

International career
Like many other RCD Espanyol players of that time, de la Riva was eligible to play for the Catalonia national team, earning one cap in a friendly against France on 1 December 1912, in which he clutched the game's only goal in a 1–0 win.

Club presidency
He was president of Espanyol on three different periods, 1920–1922, 1925–1930 and 1933–1942, and one of his main achievements was acquiring the grounds in which the Sarrià Stadium was constructed and opened in 1923, becoming the home of the espanyolistas for more than 70 years until they moved out in 1997. Acquiring their own stadium was very important in the club's bid for supremacy in Catalan football.

In 1922, he managed to bring goalkeeper Ricardo Zamora back to the club's ranks after three years at city rivials FC Barcelona. In addition, during his presidency the club won its first two Copa del Rey titles (1929 and 1940). His brothers Victorià and Santiago were also presidents of the club. In total he served as the club's president for 16 years. Genaro has been cataloged by many as the best president in the history of the club.

Death
He died in a traffic accident in February 1968, at the age of 83, along with his sister Mercedes, on a road in the north of Almería.

Honours

Club
RCD Espanyol
Catalan championship:
Champions (1): 1911–12

References

1890 births
1968 deaths
Spanish footballers
Spanish athletes
Spanish field hockey players
Spanish cricketers
Footballers from Barcelona
RCD Espanyol footballers
Association football midfielders